The Sham Wan Towers is a residential high-rise development located in the Ap Lei Chau area of Hong Kong. The complex consists of three towers, each of which rank among the tallest buildings in the city. The towers, numbered 1, 2, and 3, each rise , but differ in floor counts; Towers 1 and 2 contain 52 floors, while Tower 3 has 53. The entire complex was completed in 2003. The structures, designed by architectural firm AGC Design and developed in a collaboration between Cheung Kong Infrastructure Holdings and Sun Hung Kai Properties, are composed entirely of residential units.

Politics
Sham Wan Towers is located in Ap Lei Chau North constituency of the Southern District Council. It was formerly represented by Chan Ping-yeung, who was elected in the 2019 elections until July 2021.

See also
List of tallest buildings in Hong Kong

References

Residential buildings completed in 2003
Residential skyscrapers in Hong Kong
Ap Lei Chau
Sun Hung Kai Properties
CK Hutchison Holdings